The Great Falls Electrics were a minor league baseball team that operated out of Great Falls, Montana.  The team was formed in 1911 as part of the old Union Association league. They also played in the Northwestern League from 1916 to 1917. The team disbanded at that time and then was reformed as part of the Pioneer League in 1948. They became an affiliate of the Brooklyn Dodgers in 1952 and remained with the Dodgers through 1963. The team was briefly called the Great Falls Dodgers during the 1957 season and the Great Falls Selectrics in 1949–1950.

In 1969, the team now known as the Great Falls Voyagers began play as the Great Falls Giants and they have remained active under different names since.

The ballpark

The Electrics played at Centene Stadium then called Legion Park, located at 1015 25th Street North Great Falls, Montana. The park is still in use today, as home of the Great Falls Voyagers of the Pioneer League.

Selectrics name change 
On February 24, 1949, the advisory board of directors of the Great Falls Baseball Club agreed to change the name of the team to the Selectrics. Great Falls Breweries, Inc., the owner of the club, originally had hoped to rename the team the "Selects" to advertise its beer, but the Pioneer League rejected the proposed name change because it advertised a commercial product. The Pioneer League approved the name "Selectrics," however, which was a portmanteau of the Great Falls Breweries "Select" beer and the previous team name, "Electrics."

Notable alumni

Hall of Fame alumni

 Bobby Cox (1963) Inducted, 2014
 Joe Tinker (1900) Inducted, 1946

Notable alumni

 Tony Boeckel (1916-1917)
 Joe Bowman (1949-1950)
 Bennie Daniels (1951)
 John Roseboro (1953) 6 x MLB All-Star
 Larry Sherry (1954) 1959 World Series Most Valuable Player

Year-by-year record

References

External links
Baseball Reference

Brooklyn Dodgers minor league affiliates
Los Angeles Dodgers minor league affiliates
Defunct minor league baseball teams
Defunct Pioneer League (baseball) teams
Professional baseball teams in Montana
1963 disestablishments in Montana
Defunct sports teams in Montana
Baseball teams established in 1948
Sports clubs disestablished in 1963
1948 establishments in Montana
Sports in Great Falls, Montana
Defunct baseball teams in Montana
Union Association baseball teams
Baseball teams disestablished in 1963